Six judges of the International Criminal Court were elected during the 10th session of the Assembly of States Parties to the Rome Statute of the International Criminal Court in New York between 12 and 21 December 2011. The judges elected, Anthony Carmona of Trinidad and Tobago, Miriam Defensor Santiago of the Philippines, Chile Eboe-Osuji of Nigeria, Robert Fremr of the Czech Republic, Olga Venecia Herrera Carbuccia of the Dominican Republic and Howard Morrison of the United Kingdom, took office on 11 March 2012.

Background 
The judges elected at this session were to replace those six judges who were elected at the first election of ICC judges in 2003 for a full term of nine years; they were also to serve for nine years until 2021.

The election was governed by the Rome Statute of the International Criminal Court. Its article 36(8)(a) states that "[t]he States Parties shall, in the selection of judges, take into account the need, within the membership of the Court, for:
 (i) The representation of the principal legal systems of the world;
 (ii) Equitable geographical representation; and
 (iii) A fair representation of female and male judges."

Furthermore, article 36(3)(b) and 36(5) provide for two lists:
 List A contains those judges that "[h]ave established competence in criminal law and procedure, and the necessary relevant experience, whether as judge, prosecutor, advocate or in other similar capacity, in criminal proceedings";
 List B contains those who "[h]ave established competence in relevant areas of international law such as international humanitarian law and the law of human rights, and extensive experience in a professional legal capacity which is of relevance to the judicial work of the Court".

Each candidate had to belong to exactly one list.

Further rules of election were adopted by a resolution of the Assembly of States Parties in 2004.

Nomination process 
Following these rules, the nomination period of judges for the 2011 election lasted from 13 June to 2 September 2011 and was extended once until 16 September 2011 due to the lack of candidates from one regional group. The following persons were nominated:

The nomination period could have been extended for a maximum of six weeks (it was once), two at a time, if there had not been nominated at least twice as many candidates for each criterion as necessary.

The nomination of Ajmi Bel Haj Hamouda was withdrawn before the session.

Minimum voting requirements 
Minimum voting requirements governed part of the election. This was to ensure that article 36(8)(a) cited above was fulfilled. For this election, the following minimum voting requirements existed; they were to be adjusted once the election was underway.

Regarding the List A or B requirement, States Parties had to vote for three candidates from list A in the early rounds of voting. The minimum requirement of judges from list B was fulfilled. This requirement was not to be waived under any circumstance.

Regarding the regional criteria, initially there were three seats reserved for regional groups: one for the Eastern European States and two for the Latin American and Caribbean States. On 13 October 2011, the Bureau of the ASP notified States Parties of the application of Paragraph 20 (b) of ICC-ASP/3/Res.6 regarding the conditions for obtaining an additional regional seat, in this case referring to Asia, where the membership of the Maldives as the 17th Asian ICC member state triggered a fourth seat to be reserved for an Asian judge. Thus, there were four regional seats to be reserved for which to be voted in the early rounds of voting - one Asian seat, one Eastern European seat, and 2 GRULAC seats. The minimum requirement for judges from African and Western European and other states was fulfilled.

Regarding the gender criteria, the minimum requirement for female judges was fulfilled. States Parties had to vote for two male candidates in the early rounds of voting.

The regional and gender criteria could have been adjusted even before the election depending on the number of candidates. Paragraph 20(b) of the ASP resolution that governed the elections states that if there had been less than double the number of candidates required for each region, the minimum voting requirement would have been a (rounded-up) half of the number of candidates; except when there had been only one candidate which would have resulted in no voting requirement. Furthermore, if the number of candidates of one gender had been less than ten, then the minimum voting requirement would not have exceeded a certain number depending on the number of candidates.

The regional and gender criteria were to be dropped either if they were not (jointly) possible any more, or if after four ballots not all seats were filled (as was the case in this election).

Given the nominations (already taking into account the withdrawal of Ajmi Bel Haj Hamouda which did not change the outcome, however), the voting requirements were as follows:

Campaign on International Criminal Court Elections

Because of the importance of qualified and impartial judges, NGOs have taken a particular interest in the ICC judges election. The "Campaign on International Criminal Court Elections" was launched to promote the nomination and election of the most highly qualified officials through fair, merit-based, and transparent processes. This Campaign is sponsored by the Coalition for the International Criminal Court, a group of NGOs. Among other things, the Coalition is strongly opposed to "vote-trading" among States Parties. In December 2010, the Coalition established an Independent Panel on International Criminal Court Judicial Elections. The panel is to "issue a report containing an assessment of each judicial candidate as 'Qualified' or 'Not Qualified' after the closing of the nomination period and in advance of the December 2011 elections." The members of the panel are:
The Honourable Richard Goldstone (chair)
The Honourable Patricia Wald (vice-chair)
The Honourable Hans Corell
Judge O-Gon Kwon
Dr. Cecilia Medina Quiroga

On 26 October 2011, the Panel published a report in which it assessed the candidates as follows in regard to their qualification to serve as a judge on the ICC in their respective list:

Ballots 
Unless otherwise indicated, results are from the ASP website.

After the first ballot, the minimum voting requirement for the Asian seat was fulfilled. The list A minimum voting requirement dropped to two, the Latin American and Caribbean States (GRULAC) minimum voting requirement dropped to one and the male candidates minimum voting requirement dropped to one, as well. The Eastern European States minimum voting requirement remained at one.

After the second ballot, the minimum voting requirement for the Eastern European seat was fulfilled as well as the male candidates seat. The list A minimum voting requirement dropped to one while the GRULAC seat remained at one.

As no new judges were elected during the third and fourth ballot, the minimum voting requirement for the GRULAC seat was abandoned. Only the list A minimum voting requirement (one judge) remained in place until such a judge was elected. After the election of a list A judge in the 12th ballot all minimum voting requirements were fulfilled.

References

 2011
2011 elections
Non-partisan elections
2011
December 2011 events